Arbirlot railway station served the village of Arbirlot in the Scottish county of Angus. The station was served by a branch line, the Carmyllie Railway,  from Elliot Junction on the Dundee and Arbroath Joint Railway running between Dundee and Arbroath.

History
The line opened as a private railway in 1854 but passenger stations, including Arbirlot, opened after a Light Railway Order was obtained. Services started in 1900. The line became a joint North British Railway and Caledonian Railway operation in 1880, and so was run as a joint London and North Eastern Railway and London, Midland and Scottish Railway after the Grouping of 1923. Although passenger services ceased after seven years of this management the goods service passed on to the Scottish Region of British Railways on nationalisation in 1948, and was not withdrawn by the British Railways Board until 1975.

References 

 Station on navigable O.S. map.

External links
Carmyllie Railway

Disused railway stations in Angus, Scotland
Former Dundee and Arbroath Railway stations
Railway stations in Great Britain opened in 1900
Railway stations in Great Britain closed in 1929
1900 establishments in Scotland
1929 disestablishments in Scotland